Romeo Must Die is a 2000 American action film directed by Andrzej Bartkowiak in his feature film directorial debut, and featuring fight choreography by Corey Yuen. The film stars Jet Li and Aaliyah in her feature film debut, and follows a Chinese former police officer travelling to the United States in order to avenge his brother's death. He falls in love with a rival mobster's daughter as they struggle against both the Chinese and the American mobs. The plot is loosely related to William Shakespeare's Romeo and Juliet transplanted to contemporary Oakland, California, with Black-American and Chinese-American gangs representing the feuding families.

Frustrated by the lack of originality in Hollywood action films, producer Joel Silver built the film around Hong Kong action films. He cast established Hong Kong actor Jet Li following his role in Lethal Weapon 4. R&B singer Aaliyah was cast, and sung the soundtrack's lead single "Try Again" which topped the US Billboard Hot 100.

Romeo Must Die was released by Warner Bros. Pictures in the United States on March 24, 2000. Despite mixed critical reviews, it was a box office success, grossing $91 million against a production budget of $25 million. The film was considered Li's American film breakthrough and Aaliyah's acting breakthrough. Retrospectively, the film has received attention for the pairing of an Asian-American and Black-American in the lead roles.

Plot
Po Sing, the youngest son of Chinese Triad boss Ch'u Sing, is accosted by African-Americans in a nightclub in Oakland, California. He is rescued and then admonished by Kai, Ch'u's chief lieutenant. Po leaves the club, but he is found murdered the next day by a bicycle kid.

Han Sing, a skilled martial artist and former police officer who has been imprisoned in Hong Kong, learns of his brother's death and escapes. He travels to Oakland to investigate, where Ch'u is engaged in a joint business venture with Isaak O'Day, a black real estate developer and gang leader. The two have been acquiring deeds to properties along the waterfront to sell to Vincent Roth, a business magnate who plans to buy a new NFL franchise and build a stadium. Despite Ch'u's assurances that their partnership remains intact, Isaak fears retribution following Po's death and has his chief lieutenant, Mac, place security details on his son Colin and his daughter Trish, the latter of whom refuses to be involved in her father's illegal enterprises.

In a chance encounter, Han befriends Trish by helping her ditch her assigned security, and then discovers Po called Trish's clothing store the day before he was killed. At his brother's funeral, Han confronts his estranged father, blaming him for failing to protect Po after Han helped them both flee to America to escape Chinese authorities, which resulted in Han's imprisonment. Kai informs Han that Po's death has been the result of the escalating gang war between the Chinese and African-Americans. Meanwhile, Colin tells his father that he was supposed to meet someone at the club to discuss information that could end the war. That night, Colin and his girlfriend are murdered by an unseen assailant.

Trish and Han team up, and realize that Po wanted to show Colin a list of businesses that were either destroyed or being threatened for failing to sell their properties. The two visit one of the remaining businesses on Po's list, but the Chinese owner and his employees have been killed. After killing the Chinese hitmen responsible, Han questions his father, who deflects suspicion by suggesting Isaak may have used outside contractors. Later, Ch'u is shown ordering the death of several other Triad bosses to acquire their territories. Trish and Han visit the last holdout on Po's list: the nightclub where Po was last seen. The duo meet with the owner, but Mac arrives and kills him for his deed, and then abducts Trish and Han. At a remote location, Han defeats Mac's henchmen and goes to rescue Trish.

Isaak and Ch’u meet with Roth to sell him the deeds for the properties they now control. After Ch’u takes a multimillion-dollar payment and departs, Isaak refuses his payment, stating that his compensation will be in the form of an ownership share of the new franchise. An enraged Mac threatens Isaak to take the deal, using Trish as a hostage. He also reveals that the "gang war" was a ruse he and Ch'u concocted to cover their murder and intimidation of businessmen who refused to sign away their properties, and admits to killing Colin. In the ensuing shootout, Isaak is wounded while Roth escapes via helicopter, but Mac shoots Roth's briefcase out of his hand and the deeds scatter into the wind. Han arrives and confronts Mac about his brother, who reveals that it was the Chinese who killed Po, and is about to shoot Han when Trish shoots and kills Mac first. Trish waits with her father for an ambulance while Han leaves to find Ch'u.

At the Sing compound, Kai admits he personally killed Po for interfering with Ch'u's dealings with Roth. Han engages Kai in a fist fight, and eventually kills him. Han berates his father for killing Po out of greed, and declares that he will leave him to be punished by either the police or the other Triad families. As Han walks away, Ch'u picks up his gun and shoots himself. Han finds Trish waiting for him outside, and the two walk away together as the police arrive.

Cast
 Jet Li as Han Sing
 Jonross Fong as Young Han Sing
 Aaliyah as Trish O'Day
 Isaiah Washington as Mac
 Russell Wong as Kai
 DMX as "Silk"
 Delroy Lindo as Isaak O'Day
 DB Woodside as Colin O'Day
 Henry O as Chu Sing
 Anthony Anderson as Maurice
 Edoardo Ballerini as Vince Roth
 Françoise Yip as Meriana Sing, Motorcycle Fighter
 Terry Chen as Kung
 Tseng Chang as Victor Ho
 Jon Kit Lee as Po Sing
 Ryan Jefferson Lowe as Young Po Sing
 Matthew Harrison as Dave
 Alvin Sanders as Calvin
 Manoj Sood as Akbar

Production
During the late 1990s, the producer Joel Silver became annoyed that he did not see anything fresh or original in American action films. For inspiration, he turned to Hong Kong action cinema, where Jet Li was an established movie star. In addition to the influence of Hong Kong martial arts films, the production team also introduced a new visual effect technique: the presentation of martial arts fighting in X-ray vision. They initially experimented with it for a single fight scene with Jet Li and tested it in front of an American audience, which gave an overwhelmingly positive response, before using it in more action scenes throughout the film.

The film's setting is Oakland, California, but other than a few establishing shots, film production was entirely in Vancouver, British Columbia. Principal photography began on May 3, 1999 and ended on July 23, 1999. Filming locations included Gastown, Grandview–Woodland, Vanier Park, Chinatown, Versatile Pacific Shipyards, and the Dr. Sun Yat-Sen Classical Chinese Garden.

According to the documentary The Slanted Screen, Han and Trish were supposed to have a kissing scene, which explains the title of Romeo, but this did not test well with an urban audience. Jet Li stated on his personal website that they had filmed both versions of the scene (with kiss and without), and decided to use the latter because it would be "somewhat strange and awkward" for Han to have witnessed his father's suicide and then to come out and kiss someone.

Release
Romeo Must Die debuted at #2 at the U.S. box office behind Erin Brockovich, which had come out a week earlier. The film was produced with a budget of US$25 million. In North America, Romeo Must Die earned $18,014,503 (2,641 theaters, $6,821 per screen average) in its opening weekend. Romeo Must Dies total North American gross is $55,973,336. The film's worldwide box office gross is $91,036,760.

It was released in the United States on DVD on August 1, 2000, and on Blu-ray on August 14, 2012.

Critical reception
The film has a 32% approval rating from 94 reviews on Rotten Tomatoes, a review aggregator; the critical consensus reads: "In his second Hollywood movie, Jet Li impresses. Unfortunately, when he's not on screen, the movie slows to a crawl. Though there's some spark between Jet and Aaliyah, there isn't any threat of a fire. And as impressive as the action sequences are, some critics feel they are over-edited."

Elvis Mitchell of The New York Times called the movie "dreary" but said it was bound to be a hit due to its combination of martial arts action and hip hop.  Writing for the San Francisco Chronicle, Bob Graham likened it to The Matrix, describing it as a "cross-cultural kung fu extravaganza" that shines during Li's stunts.  In his review for the Chicago Tribune, Rene Rodriguez said the film is "needlessly convoluted" and should not have added special effects on top of Li's stunts, which he said makes them seem less impressive because of the artificiality. Roger Ebert rated the film 1.5/4 stars and also criticized the use of computer-generated special effects in a martial arts film, saying that it "misses the point" of having audiences be impressed by realistic stunts.  Aaliyah received praise for her role.

Soundtrack

The film's soundtrack, Romeo Must Die: The Album, is a hip hop and R&B soundtrack released by Blackground Records and Virgin Records America in association with Warner Bros. Records (who helped co-financed the soundtrack) on March 28, 2000. It debuted at #3 on the Billboard 200 selling 203,000 in its first week. The soundtrack sold 1.3 million copies by the end of 2000 and 1.5 million copies in the US as of 2001.

Produced by Aaliyah, Timbaland, Barry Hankerson, and Jomo Hankerson, it was recorded between May 1999 and January 2000. It includes four songs by Aaliyah, as well as works by Chante Moore, Destiny's Child, Ginuwine, Joe, Timbaland & Magoo and more. Three singles & videos were released from the album: Aaliyah's number one pop hit "Try Again" (directed by Wayne Isham), Aaliyah and DMX duet "Come Back in One Piece" (directed by Little X), and Timbaland & Magoo's "We At It Again" (directed by Chris Robinson), which introduced Timbaland's younger brother, rapper Sebastian, to audiences. Q magazine included the soundtrack album in their list of the "5 Best Compilations of 2000".

2021 rerelease
In August 2021, it was reported that Aaliyah's recorded work for Blackground (since rebranded as Blackground Records 2.0) would be re-released on physical, digital, and, for the first time ever, streaming services in a deal between the label and Empire Distribution "Romeo Must Die: The Album" was rereleased September 3, 2021.

Track listing

Weekly charts

Certifications

See also
 Jet Li filmography
 Aaliyah filmography

References

External links

 
 
 
 
 

2000 films
2000 action films
2000 directorial debut films
2000 martial arts films
2000s English-language films
American films about revenge
American action films
American martial arts films
African-American films
Films about Chinese Americans
Filicide in fiction
Films scored by Stanley Clarke
Films about African-American organized crime
Films about interracial romance
Films about race and ethnicity
Films based on Romeo and Juliet
Films directed by Andrzej Bartkowiak
Films produced by Joel Silver
Films set in 1999
Films set in Hong Kong
Films set in Oakland, California
Films shot in Vancouver
Gun fu films
Kung fu films
Silver Pictures films
Triad films
Warner Bros. films
2000s American films
2000s Hong Kong films